Kanda is a Michelin 3-star kaiseki restaurant located in Minato, Tokyo. It is owned and operated by chef Hiroyuki Kanda.

Restaurant
Chef Kanda's style been described as elegant simplicity.

See also
 List of Japanese restaurants
 List of Michelin three starred restaurants

References

External links
 

Tourist attractions in Tokyo
Restaurants in Tokyo
Michelin Guide starred restaurants in Japan